The 2017 International Darts Open was the eleventh of twelve PDC European Tour events on the 2017 PDC Pro Tour. The tournament took place at the SACHSENarena, Riesa, Germany, between 22–24 September 2017. It featured a field of 48 players and £135,000 in prize money, with £25,000 going to the winner.

Mensur Suljović was the defending champion after defeating Kim Huybrechts 6–5 in the final of the 2016 tournament, but he was defeated 6–5 in the third round by Gerwyn Price.

Peter Wright then went on to win the contest, defeating Kim Huybrechts 6–5 in the final.

Prize money 
This is how the prize money is divided:

Qualification and format 
The top 16 entrants from the PDC ProTour Order of Merit on 30 June automatically qualified for the event and were seeded in the second round.

The remaining 32 places went to players from five qualifying events – 18 from the UK Qualifier (held in Barnsley on 4 August), eight from the West/South European Qualifier (held on 21 September), four from the Host Nation Qualifier (held on 21 September), one from the Nordic & Baltic Qualifier (held on 11 August) and one from the East European Qualifier (held on 26 August).

The following players took part in the tournament:

Top 16
  Peter Wright (champion)
  Mensur Suljović (third round)
  Simon Whitlock (quarter-finals)
  Michael Smith (second round)
  Daryl Gurney (second round)
  Alan Norris (third round)
  Kim Huybrechts (runner-up)
  Jelle Klaasen (quarter-finals)
  Benito van de Pas (second round)
  Ian White (third round)
  Joe Cullen (semi-finals)
  Dave Chisnall (third round)
  Rob Cross (second round)
  Mervyn King (third round)
  Gerwyn Price (quarter-finals)
  Cristo Reyes (second round)

UK Qualifier
  Andy Hamilton (first round)
  Darren Webster (second round)
  Steve Beaton (first round)
  Simon Stevenson (first round)
  Peter Jacques (third round)
  Kyle Anderson (second round)
  Keegan Brown (second round)
  Josh Payne (third round)
  Justin Pipe (first round)
  Richie Corner (second round)
  Ted Evetts (first round)
  Chris Quantock (second round)
  Mark Webster (first round)
  William O'Connor (second round)
  Mick McGowan (first round)
  Brendan Dolan (second round)
  Steve Lennon (second round)
  Luke Woodhouse (first round)

West/South European Qualifier
  Christian Kist (second round)
  Dimitri Van den Bergh (first round)
  Vincent van der Voort (first round)
  Ronny Huybrechts (third round)
  Jerry Hendriks (first round)
  Michael Plooy (first round)
  John Michael (second round)
  Ron Meulenkamp (semi-finals)

Host Nation Qualifier
  Martin Schindler (first round)
  Bernd Roith (first round)
  Max Hopp (second round)
  Dragutin Horvat (first round)

Nordic & Baltic Qualifier
  Dennis Nilsson (quarter-finals)

East European Qualifier
  Nándor Bezzeg (first round)

Draw

References 

2017 PDC European Tour
2017 in German sport